The Archaeological Museum of Murcia (MAM) is a State-owned archaeological museum in Murcia, Spain.

History 
The Museum of Antiquities of Murcia was created by means of a 6 July 1864 royal order, constituted as an added section to the Museum of Painting and Sculpture, created earlier in the year. In 1910, the museum moved to the Cerdán building. In the 1950s, the museum moved again to its current premises, also known as Casa de la Cultura. The Spanish State transferred the museum's management to the Murcia's regional administration in 1984, while retaining its ownership.

References 
Citations

Bibliography
 
 
 
 

Museums in the Region of Murcia
Archaeological museums in Spain
Buildings and structures in Murcia